The 1937 Rice Owls football team was an American football team that represented Rice University as a member of the Southwest Conference (SWC) during the 1937 college football season. In its fourth season under head coach Jimmy Kitts, the team compiled a 6–3–2 record (4–1–1 against SWC opponents), won the conference championship, was ranked No. 18 in the final AP Poll, and outscored opponents by a total of 201 to 101.

Schedule

References

Rice
Rice Owls football seasons
Southwest Conference football champion seasons
Cotton Bowl Classic champion seasons
Rice Owls football